Celeste García (born 21 October 1964) is a Peruvian freestyle and butterfly swimmer. She competed in four events at the 1980 Summer Olympics.

References

External links
 

1964 births
Living people
Peruvian female butterfly swimmers
Peruvian female freestyle swimmers
Olympic swimmers of Peru
Swimmers at the 1980 Summer Olympics
Place of birth missing (living people)
20th-century Peruvian women